Policastro may refer to:

Places and jurisdictions
Places
 Policastro Bussentino, an Italian town and hamlet of Santa Marina, Campania
 Petilia Policastro, an Italian town and municipality in the province of Crotone, Calabria

Dioceses
 The former Roman Catholic Diocese of Policastro, and its precursor Buxentum = Bussento, which had its see in the town of Policastro Bussentino, and remains a Latin Catholic titular see as Capo della Foresta
 The current Roman Catholic Diocese of Teggiano-Policastro, created in 1986 with the union of the Dioceses of Policastro and Diano-Teggiano

People
 Paul Policastro (1900–1981), American politician who served in the New Jersey General Assembly